Identical is an American independent thriller film directed by Daniel Bollag and Seo Mutarevic and starring Jonathan Togo, Emily Baldoni, Danny Alexander, Ed Asner, and Bern Cohen. The film is inspired by true events and is based on Daniel Bollag's novel Memoirs of a Murder. The film premiered on July 23, 2011 at the Symphony Space in New York City. The film concentrates on tragic relationship between two identical twins who are intent on killing each other.

Plot
Identical twins, Mark and Rich, are born, one of them is good and the other one is evil. Even though they need each other to live, each brother deeply hates the other. When they both fall in love with the same woman, the hate increases, inevitably ending in murder.

Cast

Jonathan Togo as Mark / Rich Washington
Emily Baldoni as Shelly Worth
Aaron Refvem as Young Mark / Rich Washington
Meredith Zinner as Rebecca Washington
Ed Asner as Yaakov Washington
Kelly Baugher as Carla
Danny Alexander as Sgt. Reese
Bob Adrian as Officer Al
Michael Devine as Desk Officer
Maino as	Poet #1
Pascal Yen-Pfister as Young Yaakov Washington
Amanda Seales as Poet #2
Bob Johnson as Jamal
Bern Cohen as Rabbi Resnikoff

References

External links
 
 
 

2011 films
2011 independent films
American independent films
American thriller films
2010s English-language films
2010s American films